In the United States, driver's licenses are issued by each individual state, territory, and the District of Columbia rather than by the federal government due to federalism. Drivers are normally required to obtain a license from their state of residence. All states of the United States and provinces and territories of Canada recognize each other's licenses for non-resident age requirements. There are also licenses for motorcycle use. Generally, a minimum age of 16 is required to apply for a non-commercial driver's license, and 18 for commercial licenses which drivers must have to operate vehicles that are too heavy for a non-commercial licensed driver (such as buses, trucks, and tractor-trailers) or vehicles with at least 16 passengers (including the driver) or containing hazardous materials that require placards. A state may also suspend an individual's driving privilege within its borders for traffic violations. Many driving permits and ID cards display small digits next to each data field. This is required by the American Association of Motor Vehicle Administrators' design standard and has been adopted by many US states. According to the United States Department of Transportation, as of 2018, there are approximately 227 million licensed drivers in the United States.

History

As the number of motor vehicles in the US reached tens of thousands, state and local governments assumed a new power: authorizing vehicles and drivers. In 1901, New York became the first state to register automobiles. By 1918 all US states required license plates; states were slower to require licenses for drivers. Only 39 states issued them by 1935 and few required a test, despite widespread concern about incompetent drivers. Early motorists were taught to drive by automobile salesmen, family and friends, or organizations like the YMCA. By the 1930s, many high schools offered driver education.

Massachusetts and Missouri were the first states to require a driver license in 1903, but there was no test associated with the license. In 1908, Henry Ford launched the Model T, the first affordable automobile for many middle-class Americans (in 1919, when Michigan started issuing driver licenses, Ford got his first one at age 56). The same year the Model T debuted, Rhode Island became the first state to require both a license and a driver's exam (Massachusetts instituted a chauffeur exam in 1907 and started requiring tests for all other drivers in 1920). Maryland's driver's licenses did not feature photographs until the 1980s.

Decline in licensing among juveniles 
Since the 1990s, young people have generally been less likely to start driving as teenagers than in previous decades. In 2018, 61% of 18-year-olds and 25% of 16-year-olds in the US had drivers licenses, a decline from 80% and 46%, respectively, in 1983. This continued a trend that had been observed in 2004, when the Los Angeles Times reported that 43% of US 15-to-17-year-olds had drivers licenses in 2002, compared to 52% in 1982. 

Potential explanations for this decline include lower enthusiasm for driving, caused by environmental and road safety concerns; financial issues, such as the costs of driver's education and insurance premiums; stricter standards for granting licenses; and the rising popularity of ridesharing services such as Uber and Lyft.

Standard and special licenses 
 Unrestricted licenses are driver licenses that most US drivers have to drive. Various states differ on what class they utilize to distinguish between a typical driver license and special licenses, such as restricted, chauffeur, or motorcycle licenses. For instance, Tennessee designates Class D as a regular driver license, while Class M is a motorcycle license and Class H is a hardship license (see below).
 Hardship licenses for minors are driver licenses that are restricted to drivers between 14 and 15 (sometimes up to 18) years old who need to drive to and from home and school due to serious hardships, e.g. the driver's family has financial or medical problems, or the driver needs to get to work or school and has no other practical way of getting to work or school. A hardship license for minors is distinct from hardship licenses granted for drivers with revoked or suspended licenses. The table below includes states that provide hardship licenses for minors.
 Provisional licenses are functionally the same as a driver license, but are typically issued to new drivers under the age of 18, i.e. 14 to 17 years old. Almost all states have some form of a graduated licensing provision. The actual restrictions and the length of time a new driver must adhere to them vary widely by state. Restrictions frequently include:
 A curfew, after which night driving is not permitted (unless 18 years of age, or if the individual has completed an online course) without an adult present (typically 11pm, like Pennsylvania, Michigan, or 12am, like Wisconsin). Some states (e.g. North Carolina) have curfews as early as 9pm. Some states such as New York provide exceptions for special situations, such as driving home from work or school functions, picking up family members, or for medical appointments, while others such as Massachusetts do not.
 Restrictions on the number of passengers under a specific age present in the vehicle. For example, in California, minors may not transport people under age 20 for the first 12 months of licensure unless said passengers are family members (brother, sister, cousin, niece, nephew, or anyone who is 21 or had their license for 1 year or longer, etc.).
 Chauffeur licenses are practically the same as a passenger car license, but also allow the holder to drive a taxi, limousine, or other livery vehicle for hire. In the US, chauffeur licenses are not considered a special driver's license (such as a commercial driver's license), and many states do not require an additional road test for a passenger car license to convert to a chauffeur license. Some states may require a short written exam on taxi-specific driving laws or a background check and require the driver to be at least 18 years of age. This type of license is typically, though not universally, called "Class E". Some states add an endorsement to a regular license, while others require no special permission at the state level to drive a taxi or limousine. Florida once issued chauffeur licenses through its Class D licenses, a designation that was discontinued in 2006. Regardless of whether and how the state handles chauffeur licensing, a permit or license must always be obtained from the city, town, or county where the driver will be operating.
 Motorcycle licenses covers motorcycles only, frequently combined with a regular driver license. In some states this does not include some types of mopeds, scooters, or motorized bicycles, but with a wide variety of different state-by-state definitions for these vehicles. These vehicles sometimes do not require a motorcycle license, or in some states any license at all, as well as in some states avoiding insurance and registration requirements, such as US states Arkansas, Texas, Washington, and Utah, which do not require any motorcycle endorsement for off-highway use under 60 mph. Some US states differentiate between low and full powered motorcycles for the purposes of licensing. Some states require an additional motorcycle license to operate a sidecar rig.
 Enhanced licenses are issued to US citizens in Washington, Vermont, Michigan, Minnesota, and New York, and establish nationality in addition to driving privileges. An EDL is a WHTI compliant document, acceptable for re-entering the US via land and sea crossings from Canada, Mexico, or the Caribbean. A US passport, birth certificate, or another document proving citizenship is required to apply for this type of license. Motorcycle and commercial driver licenses (see above and below) usually can also be issued as enhanced.
 Handicap permits are issued to persons who meet the proper guidelines for requiring handicap driving and parking access. They are granted special access to improve their quality of life as a driver. In certain states, namely Texas, a handicapped person's driver license can be revoked based on their disability.

Some states also have additional classifications. Nevada, for example, has a separate license category for drivers who only operate mopeds, while some more northerly states have separate categories for snowmobiles and ATVs. South Carolina and Georgia have non-commercial versions of every commercial class license for agricultural purposes.

Commercial driver's licenses (CDL) 

Drivers of large and heavy vehicles (i.e. trucks, buses, and tractor-trailers) or a vehicle of any size with at least 16 passengers (including the driver) or hazardous materials must have a commercial driver's license, commonly abbreviated as CDL. The minimum age for a commercial driver's license is generally 18 years old, but federal law requires commercial drivers to be at least 21 years of age to operate a commercial motor vehicle in interstate commerce. An unrestricted driver's license is a prerequisite in all states before a commercial driver's license can be issued.

Most recreational and agricultural vehicles such as converted buses, tractor, lawn mowers, or full size (greater than  campers, including fire trucks are exempt from CDL regulations. However, federal law allows states to require a CDL for these vehicles. Some states require drivers who operate large and heavy vehicles strictly used for recreational and/or agricultural purposes to upgrade to a special driver's license or add an endorsement to their license usually by passing a written test, road test, or both. For example, in California, recreational vehicles require the driver to possess a "non-commercial" license (to distinguish from commercial driver licenses) to drive (Non-Commercial Class B) or tow (Non-Commercial Class A) a motorhome between 40 and 45 feet. In New York, recreational vehicles that exceed 26,000lbs (11,794kg) GVWR requires an R endorsement on a driver's license.

On 14 May 2022, New York lowered the minimum age for a CDL Class A from 21 to 18 years, making Hawaii the last and only state to have 21 as the minimum age. Previously, New York Law allowed 18 to 20-year-olds to be issued a CDL Class B or C, but not a CDL Class A until they turn 21. The Infrastructure Investment and Jobs Act signed by President Joe Biden authorized a pilot experiment to allow 18 to 20-year-olds with a CDL to operate in interstate commerce in an effort to alleviate the national truck driver shortage provided they meet all other requirements for operating in interstate commerce.

CDL classifications 
Class A: Any combination of vehicles providing the trailer being towed has a gross vehicle weight rating of more than 10,000 lbs (4,536kg) resulting in the gross combination weight rating of the combined vehicles to be 26,001lbs (11,794kg) or more.
Class B: Any single vehicle which has a gross vehicle weight rating of 26,001lbs (11,794kg) or more.
Class C: Any single vehicle which has a gross vehicle weight rating of 26,000lbs (11,793kg) or less that is designed to either transport 16 or more passengers (including the driver) or hazardous materials under 49 U.S.C. 5103 and is required to be placarded under subpart F of 49 CFR Part 172 or is transporting any quantity of a material listed as a select agent or toxin in 42 CFR Part 73.

Some states (such as New York and Nevada with endorsement) allow drivers with a CDL Class B or C to tow vehicles of more than 10,000lbs (4,536kg) as long as the gross combination weight rating of the combined vehicles does not go over 26,000lbs (11,794kg). In other states, drivers with a CDL Class B or C may only tow vehicles with a gross vehicle weight rating of 10,000lbs (4,536kg) or less.

Commercial drivers are usually required to add endorsements to their CDL to drive certain types of vehicles that require additional training. CDL endorsements requirements are mostly similar, but some vary between states. The training and testing requirements are regulated by the US Department of Transportation. Endorsements are as follows:
 P: Passenger Transport (required to transport 16 or more passengers and to drive a bus)
 H: Hazardous Materials (requires a TSA background check as well as an extensive written exam. Required to haul dangerous goods. The driver must be at least 21 years old.)
 N: Tank Vehicles (Required for carrying liquids in bulk.)
 T: Double/Triple Trailers (Class A licenses only - required to operate double or triple trailers. In most states, only two trailers can be towed; only 13 states allow triple trailers.)
 X: Hazardous Materials and Tank Combination
 S: School Bus (In addition to a standard bus endorsement, more stringent TSA and CORI background checks are required. Required to operate a school bus and transport students to/from school.)

There are two endorsements that do not come with a code:
 Air Brakes: Required to drive vehicles equipped with air brakes. If the CDL holder decides not to pass the written test, or be tested on a vehicle without air brakes, they'll be assigned an L restriction that will bar them from operating vehicles with air brakes.
 Combination Vehicles: Required for the Class A CDL to drive combination vehicles. Without passing this test, the applicant cannot apply for a Class A CDL, though they may instead opt for the Class B or Class C CDL.

CDL restrictions
Licenses can be restricted through any of the following ways:
 B: Corrective Lenses are required while operating a motor vehicle.
 C: A mechanical aid is required to operate a commercial vehicle.
 D: A prosthetic aid is required to operate a commercial vehicle.
 E: The driver may only operate a commercial vehicle with an automatic transmission.
 F: An outside mirror is required on the commercial vehicle.
 G: The driver of a commercial vehicle is only allowed to operate during daylight hours.
 K: Drivers are authorized to drive a commercial vehicle within the state of issue (intrastate) only. This restriction applies to any holder of a CDL license who is under 21 years old or is not healthy enough to cross state lines.
 L: Drivers are restricted from operating a commercial vehicle with air brakes. This restriction is issued when a driver either fails the air brake component of the general knowledge test or performs the CDL road skills test in a vehicle not equipped with air brakes.
 M: CDL-A holders may operate CDL-B school buses only.
 N: CDL-A and CDL-B holders may operate CDL-C school buses only.
 O: Driver limited to pintail hook trailers only.
 Z: Alcohol Interlock Device required in the commercial vehicle.
 T: 60-day temporary license.

Foreign officials and diplomats
In a rare exception to states and territories issuing driver licenses, the State Department's Office of Foreign Missions (OFM) issues driver licenses to foreign officials and diplomats, bypassing the states and territories in which they live. OFM-issued driver licenses are equivalent to a regular state-issued license.

Driver's licensing laws 

The minimum age to obtain a restricted driver license in the US varies from 14 years, three months in South Dakota to as high as 17 in New Jersey. In most states, a graduated licensing law applies to newly-licensed teenage drivers, going by names such as Provisional Driver, Junior Operator, Probationary Driver, or Intermediate License. These licenses restrict certain driving privileges, such as whether the new driver may carry passengers and if so how many, as well as setting a curfew for young drivers. For example, Utah drivers who are under 18 may not drive other people outside the family in their first six months with a license. Unlike in some states of Australia and some provinces of Canada, graduated licensing laws do not require lowered speed limits, displaying of L and P plates, restrictions on towing a trailer or boat, or prohibitions on highway driving or operating high performance cars.

Drivers under 18 are usually required to attend a comprehensive driver's education program either at their high school or a professional driving school and take a certain number of behind-the-wheel lessons with a certified driving instructor before applying for a license. Some states like New York also require new adult drivers to attend some form of driver education before applying for a license.

In some states all newly licensed adult drivers may be on probation for a set amount of time (usually between six months and two years), during which traffic violations carry harsher penalties or mandatory suspensions that would not apply to experienced drivers.

The United States Department of Transportation requires all drivers with a commercial driver's license to pass a periodic physical examination every two years before renewal and to be at least 21 years old to operate in interstate commerce or to transport hazardous materials requiring the driver to place placards on the vehicle, but allow states to issue a commercial driver's license to drivers under 21 providing they only operate within state lines (intrastate commerce). All drivers who will drive commercial motor vehicles that do not require a commercial driver's license in interstate commerce must also be at least 21 years old and are subject to the same health requirements as drivers with a CDL.

In 2017, Oregon became the first state in the U.S. to offer residents who identify as transgender, gender nonconforming, or non-binary to designate their gender as "X" on their licenses or identification cards. Other states (including the District of Columbia) that allow transgender, gender nonconforming, and non-binary residents to select "X" as their gender include Hawaii, California, Washington, Idaho, Nevada, New Mexico, Colorado, Arkansas, Illinois, Indiana, Minnesota, Wisconsin, Virginia, Maryland, Pennsylvania, New York, New Jersey, Connecticut, Massachusetts, Vermont, Maine, New Hampshire, and Rhode Island. Utah and Ohio require governmental approval for an "X" gender marker. All other states do not offer a third-gender option. The American Civil Liberties Union, transgender activists and members of the LGBTQ+ community praise the new changes as helping individuals have a driver's license that corresponds to their gender identity which may not align with their sex (male or female). 

As of 2023, 16 states including the District of Columbia do not require a social security number to apply for a non-commercial driver's license allowing residents regardless of their immigration status to operate passenger cars, motorcycles, and mopeds. These states include California, Colorado, Connecticut, Delaware, Hawaii, Illinois, Maryland, Massachusetts, Nevada, New Jersey, New Mexico, New York, Oregon, Rhode Island, Utah, Vermont, Virginia, and Washington.

Licenses for adults and minors; GDL laws
Below is a list of Graduated Driver's Licenses (GDL) and hardship licenses for minors laws for each of the 50 states and the District of Columbia. The list includes the state agency responsible for issuing driver's licenses and the length of time that a full (unrestricted) driver's license is valid for.

Use as identification and proof of age
Driver's licenses issued in the United States have a number or alphanumeric code issued by the issuing state's department of motor vehicles (or equivalent), usually show a photograph of the bearer, as well as a copy of the bearer's signature, the address of the bearer's primary residence, the type or class of license, restrictions, endorsements (if any), the physical characteristics of the bearer (such as height, weight, hair color and eye color) and birth date. Driver's license numbers issued by a state are unique. Social Security numbers are now prohibited by federal law from appearing on new driver's licenses due to identity theft concerns. In most states, to be compliant with AAMVA standards, the orientation of a driver's license for persons under the age of 21 is vertical while a driver's license for those over the age of 21 is horizontal. Since the driver's license is often used as proof of a person's age, the difference in orientation makes it easy to determine that a person is legally allowed to purchase alcohol or tobacco (the drinking and tobacco age in all U.S. states is 21). Some states, such as Arizona, do not require that a driver's license be changed to horizontal at age 21. The vertical license does not expire until age 65 in the state of Arizona. Most states require that when a driver establishes residence in a state, he or she must obtain a license issued by that state within a limited time.

Because there is no national identity card in the United States, the driver's license is often used as the de facto equivalent for completion of many common business and governmental transactions. As a result, driver's licenses are stolen and used for identity theft. Driver's licenses were not always identification cards. In many states, driver's licenses did not even have a photograph until the 1980s. Advocacy by Mothers Against Drunk Driving for photo ID age verification in conjunction with increasing the drinking age to 21 to reduce underage drinking led to photographs being added to all state licenses. New York and Tennessee were the last states to add photos in 1986. New Jersey later allowed drivers to get non-photo licenses, but that option was subsequently revoked. Vermont license holders have the option of receiving a non-photo license. Tennessee drivers 60 years of age or older had the option of a non-photo driver's license prior to January 2013, when photo licenses were required for voting identification. Those with valid non-photo licenses were allowed to get a photo license when their current license expired. Thirteen states allow a non-photo driver's license for reasons of religious belief: Arkansas, Indiana, Kansas, Minnesota, Missouri, Nebraska, New Jersey, North Dakota, Oregon, Pennsylvania, Tennessee, Washington, and Wisconsin.

Later additions to licenses have included fingerprints, bar codes, magnetic strips, social security numbers, and tamper-proof features, most of which were added to prevent identity theft and to curb the use of fake IDs. States have slowly added digitized features to driver's licenses, which incorporate holograms and bar codes to reduce forgery.

Non-driver identification cards
Many states provide identification cards for people who do not drive, usually through the same agency that issues driver's licenses.

Real ID

The Department of Homeland Security enforces standards of the Real ID Act of 2005 for identification of applicants and license design for state-issued driver licenses and identification cards. States are not required to comply with Real ID, but any driver licenses or ID cards issued by that state will not be valid for any official purpose with the federal government, including entering federal buildings or boarding airplanes.

For a state to comply with Real ID, licenses and ID cards issued from that state must be approved by DHS to meet Real ID requirements.

States can choose to issue both regular licenses and ID cards as well as Real IDs, but any non-Real ID must be marked "Not for Federal Identification". Real IDs are normally valid for eight years.

Real IDs are allowed to be issued only to legal immigrants and citizens of the United States.

An applicant for a Real ID, either as a new driver license or ID card applicant, or renewing a current license or ID card, must present a citizenship document (US passport, certified birth certificate or citizenship certificate) or proof of legal immigrant status, proof of a Social Security number if they have been issued one, proof of any name changes if using birth certificate, and two proofs of residency in the state. The state then must verify the documents and store them either electronically or on paper. No one may have more than one Real ID at one time.

A Real ID can be identified with a gold or black star located on the top right third of the ID, depending on the state. , all U.S. states and territories have been certified as compliant with the law except American Samoa, which is under review. See RealID article for dates of adoption by individual states.

Enhanced driver's licenses
Some states, mostly those with an international border, issue enhanced driver's licenses and enhanced ID cards. Enhanced licenses combine a regular driver's license with the specifications of the new federal passport card. Thus, in addition to providing driving privileges, the enhanced license also is proof of US citizenship, and can therefore be used to cross the Canadian and Mexican borders by road, rail, or sea, although air travel still requires a traditional passport book. The enhanced licenses are also fully Real ID compliant.

On March 27, 2008, the Secretary of Homeland Security announced that Washington's enhanced driver's license was the first one approved under the Western Hemisphere Travel Initiative. According to a Homeland Security press release, the department is working with Arizonan authorities to develop enhanced driver's licenses. On September 16, 2008, New York began issuing enhanced driver's licenses that meet WHTI requirements. Texas was expected to implement an enhanced driver's license program, but the program has been blocked by Texas Governor Rick Perry, despite a state law authorizing the Texas Department of Public Safety to issue EDLs and a ruling by the state attorney general, Greg Abbott, that Texas's production of EDLs would comply with federal requirements.

, Vermont, New York, Michigan, and Washington were issuing enhanced driver's licenses and ID cards. In January 2014, Minnesota became the fifth state to issue enhanced driver's licenses, while Ohio is set to become the sixth state once it has been approved by its legislature.

Digital driver's licenses
As of December 2021, approximately 20 US states have launched, tested, or considered digital driver's licenses, with Arizona, Connecticut, Georgia, Iowa, Kentucky, Maryland, Oklahoma and Utah partnering with Apple to the identification through the Apple Wallet on the iPhone and Apple Watch.

California, Iowa, and Delaware have proposed digital drivers licenses as a means of identification. The license would be available as an app by MorphoTrust USA and installed on a user's personal cellphone. Questions have been raised about user privacy, since a police officer may ask for one's license and gain access to one's cellphone.

Louisiana passed House Bill 481 in 2014 which became Act 625, making Louisiana the first state with a legally accepted digital driver's license via LA Wallet, an app created by Envoc that launched in July 2018. The law allows Louisiana residents to present driver identification using LA Wallet "...upon demand of any officer or agent of the department or any police officer of the state, parish, or municipality...". The Louisiana digital driver's license requires no additional hardware to accept and includes a “no-touch” policy whereby the citizen remains in possession of the mobile device at all times. In October 2018, the Louisiana Secretary of State Kyle Ardoin approved the usage of LA Wallet for voter identification at the polling stations. In January 2019, the Louisiana Office of Alcohol and Tobacco Control issued a notice legally approving LA Wallet, Louisiana's Digital Driver's License app for purchase age verification for tobacco and alcohol sales. In May 2021, LA Wallet expanded to include an individual's COVID-19 vaccination status and as of mid-June 2021, more than 100,000 people, or 14 percent of all LA Wallet users had added their COVID-19 vaccination status to the app. As of August 2021, LA Wallet had a userbase of 804,000 unique licenses across 1.5 million devices.

See also

 Department of Motor Vehicles
 Commercial driver's license
 Vehicle registration plates of the United States
 Joshua's Law
 Transportation safety in the United States

Notes

References

United States
Government documents of the United States
Minimum ages
Transportation in the United States
Identity documents of the United States